Gerda Maurus (25 August 1903 – 31 July 1968) was an Austrian actress.

She was of Croatian descent and initially made her name on stage in Vienna. While performing in the theatre, she was discovered by the director Fritz Lang during a visit to his native city. Lang cast her in the female lead in his silent thriller film Spione (1928) and she appeared in a number of German films during the Weimar and Nazi eras.

Selected filmography
 Spione (1928)
 Frau im Mond (1929)
 High Treason (1929)
  (1930)
 The Daredevil (1931)
 Alarm at Midnight (1931)
 The Stranger (1931)
 Checkmate (1931)
 Death Over Shanghai (1932)
 The White Demon (1932)
 Invisible Opponent (1933)
 The Double (1934)
 A Woman With Power of Attorney (1934)
 The Cossack and the Nightingale (1935)
 The Call of the Jungle (1936)
 Daphne and the Diplomat (1937)
 My Wife's Friends (1949)
 The Little Town Will Go to Sleep (1954)

References

Bibliography

External links

 

1903 births
1968 deaths
Austrian stage actresses
Austrian film actresses
Austrian silent film actresses
20th-century Austrian actresses
Austrian people of Croatian descent
Austrian emigrants to Germany